Four Brothers may refer to:
 Four Brothers (Cascade Range) in Washington state, U.S.
 Four Brothers (mountain range) in Del Norte County, California, U.S.
 "Four Brothers" (jazz standard), composed by Jimmy Giuffre
 Four Brothers (film), a 2005 film directed by John Singleton
 Four Brothers (band), Zimbabwean Jit band
 The Four Brothers Band, a jazz big band organized in 1947 by Woody Herman
 Lung Kong Tin Yee Association, an ethnic Chinese fraternity also known as the Four Brothers

See also
 The Brothers Four, an American folk singing group